The 1984 All-Ireland Minor Hurling Championship was the 54th staging of the All-Ireland Minor Hurling Championship since its establishment by the Gaelic Athletic Association in 1928. The championship began on 19 April 1984 and ended on 16 September 1984.

Galway entered the championship as the defending champions, however, they were beaten by Kilkenny in the All-Ireland semi-final.

On 16 September 1984, Limerick won the All-Ireland title following a 2-05 to 2-04 defeat of Kilkenny in the All-Ireland final replay. This was their third All-Ireland title overall and their first title since 1958.

Results

Leinster Minor Hurling Championship

Quarter-finals

Semi-finals

Final

Munster Minor Hurling Championship

First round

Semi-finals

Final

All-Ireland Minor Hurling Championship

Semi-finals

Finals

Championship statistics

Miscellaneous

 Limerick won the Munster Championship for the first time since 1963.

References

External links
 All-Ireland Minor Hurling Championship: Roll Of Honour

Minor
All-Ireland Minor Hurling Championship